The Tijuana Mexico Temple is a temple of the Church of Jesus Christ of Latter-day Saints (LDS Church) in Tijuana, México. Completed in 2015, the intent to construct the temple was announced by church president Thomas S. Monson on October 2, 2010, during the church's semi-annual general conference. It is the thirteenth temple built in Mexico.

Temple site and development

The Tijuana Mexico Temple was constructed in southeastern Tijuana near Cerro Colorado.

A groundbreaking ceremony was held August 18, 2012, with Benjamin De Hoyos presiding and Jose L. Alonso directing. A public open house was held from 13 to 28 November 2015, excluding Sundays. The temple was formally dedicated by Dieter F. Uchtdorf on December 13, 2015. Following its dedication, Clark B. Hinckley, son of former church president Gordon B. Hinckley, served as the temple's first president until 2018.

In 2020, along with all the church's other temples, the Tijuana Mexico Temple was closed due to the COVID-19 pandemic.

See also

 Comparison of temples of The Church of Jesus Christ of Latter-day Saints
 List of temples of The Church of Jesus Christ of Latter-day Saints
 List of temples of The Church of Jesus Christ of Latter-day Saints by geographic region
 Temple architecture (Latter-day Saints)
 The Church of Jesus Christ of Latter-day Saints in Mexico

References

External links

Tijuana Mexico Temple Official site
Tijuana Mexico Temple at ChurchofJesusChristTemples.org

21st-century Latter Day Saint temples
Buildings and structures in Tijuana
Temples (LDS Church) in Mexico
Religious buildings and structures completed in 2015
2015 establishments in Mexico
2015 in Christianity